The 2011–12 Polish Basketball League (Tauron Basket Liga for sponsorship reasons) was the 84th edition of the Polish national championship.

The regular season started on 8 October 2011. The season ended on 6 June 2012, when Asseco Prokom Gdynia won their 9th consecutive title in a row this season, by beating Trefl Sopot 4–3 in the Finals.

Participants 
Anwil Włocławek
Asseco Prokom Gdynia 
AZS Koszalin
AZS Politechnika Warszawska
Energa Czarni Słupsk
Kotwica Kołobrzeg
ŁKS Łódź
PBG Basket Poznań
PGE Turów Zgorzelec
Polpharma Starogard Gd.
Siarka Jezioro Tarnobrzeg
WKS Śląsk Wrocław
Trefl Sopot
Zastal Zielona Góra

Note
 Asseco Prokom Gdynia did not participate in the regular season, but entered the Second Phase.

Regular season

| rowspan=8 |Qualified for the Playoffs

Playoffs

Awards
Most Valuable Player:  Walter Hodge (Zielona Gora Basket)
Finals MVP:  Jerel Blassingame (Asseco Prokom Gdynia)

Polish clubs in European competitions

Polish clubs in Regional competitions

See also
VTB United League 2011–12

References

External links
Polska Liga Koszykówki - Official Site 
Polish League at Eurobasket.com

Polish Basketball League seasons
Polish
Lea